Ava Elizabeth Stewart (born September 30, 2005) is an American-born Canadian artistic gymnast. She represented Canada at the 2020 Summer Olympics and is the 2021 Canadian National Champion on the uneven bars and the all-around silver medalist.

Early life 
Stewart was born in Lebanon, Tennessee in 2005 to an American mother and a Canadian father. Her family moved to Bowmanville, Ontario in 2010. She began gymnastics when she was eighteen months old.

Gymnastics career 
Stewart trains at Gemini Gymnastics alongside Ana Padurariu and Bailey Inglis. She is coached by 1980 Olympic Champion Elena Davydova.

Junior

2020 
Stewart made her elite debut at Elite Canada where she finished third in the junior all-around behind Maya Zonneveld and Cassie Lee. As a result, she was selected to make her international debut at L'International Gymnix. While there, she was part of the Canadian team that finished fourth. Individually, she finished seventh in the all-around and won the bronze medal on the balance beam behind Americans Konnor McClain and Skye Blakely.

Senior

2021 
Stewart became age-eligible for senior competition in 2021 and made her senior debut at Elite Canada, which was held virtually due to the COVID-19 pandemic in Canada. She finished second in the all-around and on balance beam behind Ellie Black, first on floor exercise, and third on uneven bars behind Rose-Kaying Woo and Black. Stewart was scheduled to compete at the Doha World Cup in March; however, the event was postponed due to the COVID-19 pandemic in Qatar. Stewart next competed at two Technical Trials where she finished second in the all-around behind Black at both. Stewart competed at the Canadian Championships where she once again finished second in the all-around behind Black. Additionally she finished first on uneven bars, second on balance beam behind Black, and fourth on floor exercise behind Brooklyn Moors, Black, Lillian Bate. 

On June 17, Stewart was officially named to Canada's 2020 Olympic team alongside Black, Moors, and Shallon Olsen. Had the Olympic Games not been postponed, Stewart would not have been age-eligible for the competition due to her 2005 birth year. Stewart made her senior international debut at the Olympic Games. The Canadian team finished tenth in the qualification round and did not advance to the finals.

2022 
Stewart competed at the 2022 City of Jesolo Trophy where she helped Canada finish third in the team competition.  Individually she qualified to and finished fifth in the uneven bars event final.  In July Stewart competed at the Pan American Championships where she helped Canada finish third as a team.

Eponymous skill

Competitive history

References

External links 
 Ava Stewart at Gymnastics Canada
 

2005 births
Living people
Canadian female artistic gymnasts
Sportspeople from Ontario
Gymnasts at the 2020 Summer Olympics
Olympic gymnasts of Canada